Puppies Puppies aka Jade Kuriki Olivo (b. 1989) is a contemporary artist known primarily for her conceptual works of sculpture, installation, and performance art. Her practice mobilizes readymade objects and characters from popular culture while questioning the authority of various institutional practices in the medical field, the university, and museum space. Her 2017 work Liberté (Liberty), was the first and only work of performance art to be acquired by the Whitney Museum of American Art for its permanent collection.

Early life and education 
Puppies Puppies grew up outside of Dallas, Texas. Her mother is Japanese and her father is Puerto Rican. She attended the School of The Art Institute of Chicago, as well as Yale University's MFA program. She became interested in performance as an art form in high school when she dressed up as her school's mascot. In 2010, the artist had a life-threatening brain tumor, which was successfully removed.

Work 
The artist is known for working in a wide range of media and materials, including blood, The Lord of the Rings and Harry Potter fan art, crab carapaces, Swiffers and Minions paraphernalia. her 2015 exhibition HorseshoeCrabs HorseshoeCrabs at the Freddy Gallery, Baltimore displayed various artistic interpretations of the horseshoe crab, an arthropod whose blood is often drained for use in pharmaceutical manufacturing. 

In 2016 she participated in the Berlin Biennale, presenting a new video each day of the biennale. 

The following year, her work Liberté (Liberty) was included in the Whitney Biennial. The piece involved a performer wearing a green gown along with a crown standing on an outdoor terrace of the Whitney Museum; simultaneously, the Whitney's gift shop sold $5 liberty crowns to visitors. The work is the only piece of performance art in the Whitney permanent collection. 

In 2019, Interview Magazine published a conversation between Laura Albert and Puppies Puppies, where the artist publicly revealed her identity for the first time, coming out as a "Latinx transgender woman." Her 2019 solo show at Remai Modern in Saskatoon, Saskatchewan engaged blood as a subject. The exhibition displayed a bag of the artist's own blood, as well as providing on-site HIV testing and blood donation services to visitors. Her work focuses on frequent collaboration, especially with other queer and trans artists such as Bri Williams and Elliot Reed.

Kuriki Olivo routinely attends the Stonewall Protests. Organized by Qween Jean and Joela Rivera, who hold weekly demonstrations for the past since the wake of the murder of George Floyd, the protests include groups like Riders4Rights and Musicians United NYC.

References

Living people
1989 births
21st-century American women artists
American contemporary artists
American women performance artists
American performance artists
Transgender artists
Hispanic and Latino American women in the arts
Transgender women
LGBT Hispanic and Latino American people
American LGBT people of Asian descent
LGBT people from Texas
Artists from Dallas